Jonathan Davenport (born October 31, 1983), nicknamed Superman, is an American professional dirt track and stock car racing driver. He competes in the Lucas Oil Late Model Dirt Series, driving the No. 49 for Double L Motorsports, and part-time in the NASCAR Cup Series, driving the No. 13 Chevrolet Camaro ZL1 for Kaulig Racing. Davenport is a 3-time champion in the Lucas Oil Late Model Dirt Series, having won the title in 2015, 2018, and 2019, and a 5-time champion of the World 100 at Eldora Speedway.

Racing career

Early career
Davenport ran in Legend Cars and Asphalt Pro Late Models before making his Dirt Late Model debut in 2004.

Dirt Late Models

Since 2005, Davenport has competed in the Lucas Oil Late Model Dirt Series, winning Rookie of the Year in 2012, and the championship in 2015, 2018, and 2019. He has earned 69 wins, 191 top fives, and over 282 top tens, making him one of the most successful drivers in the series.

Since 2004, Davenport has also competed in the World of Outlaws Late Model Series, but mostly runs part-time to focus on running in other late model events. His best result was a 16th-place points finish in 2011, despite running 11 out of the 34 races, along with 15 wins, 48 top fives, and 70 top tens. 

Davenport has also competed in the World 100, which is mostly known as the most prestigious dirt late model race in the United States. He would win the championship five times: 2015, 2017, 2019, 2021, and 2022.

NASCAR Camping World Truck Series
In 2013, Davenport attempted to make his NASCAR Camping World Truck Series debut at the Martinsville Speedway spring race, driving the No. 1 for MAKE Motorsports, but would fail to qualify.

NASCAR Cup Series
On March 9, 2023, Kaulig Racing announced that Davenport will make his NASCAR Cup Series debut at the Food City Dirt Race, driving the No. 13 car. He will attempt to make his first NASCAR start since failing to qualify for the Truck Series spring race at Martinsville in 2013.

Motorsports career results

NASCAR 
(key) (Bold – Pole position awarded by qualifying time. Italics – Pole position earned by points standings or practice time. * – Most laps led.)

Cup Series

Camping World Truck Series

References

External links
 
 

Living people
1983 births
Racing drivers from Georgia (U.S. state)
NASCAR drivers
People from Blairsville, Georgia